The Sardinia Project (Progetto Sardegna, PS) was a social-democratic regionalist political party active in Sardinia, Italy.

It was founded in 2003 and was led by Renato Soru, who was elected President of Sardinia at the head of a centre-left coalition in the 2004 regional election. In that occasion PS won 7.8% of the vote in Sardinia, becoming the fourth largest party in the region.

In October 2007 PS was merged into the Democratic Party.

Political parties in Sardinia
Political parties established in 2003
Progressivism